Paul Lee Willson (born December 25, 1945) is an American film, television and voice actor well known for many roles, including as Paul Krapence on Cheers.

Early life
He was born in Fairmont, Minnesota, the son of Doris Geraldine and Lee Wilford Willson, and was raised in San Francisco, California. He attended Reed College in Portland, Oregon, where he began performing in improvisational theatre.

Career 
Willson has played numerous guest characters on a variety of shows including Laverne & Shirley as Eraserhead in episode "A Date with Eraserhead", and Full House as Stu in episode "Crimes and Michelle's Demeanor" in 1990, Curb Your Enthusiasm, Boston Public, Caroline in the City, The Newsroom and Star Trek: Voyager.

He is perhaps most famous for his repeated guest character of Paul Krapence on the television show Cheers (which he also reprised in an episode of the Cheers spin-off, Frasier). His character was originally called "Gregg" because Paul Vaughn was already playing a character named "Paul" on Cheers.

For five years (1986-1990) he was Garry Shandling's neighbor Leonard Smith on It's Garry Shandling's Show. Willson also appeared on Garry Shandling's The Larry Sanders Show playing Larry's accountant, and the brother of Sid the cue card holder.

He played Ed, a neighbor, in a few episodes of Malcolm in the Middle, and also appeared in an episode of The Golden Girls.

His film appearances include The Pack (1977), The Devonsville Terror (1983), My Best Friend Is a Vampire (1987), Moving (1988), 976-EVIL (1988), Problem Child 2 (1991), Circuitry Man (1990), Plughead Rewired: Circuitry Man II (1994) and the comedy film Office Space (1999) as one of "The Bobs". Willson also appeared on the CBS sitcoms The King of Queens and The Big Bang Theory.

He's also done voice work as Mr. Detweiler T.J.'s father in Disney's Recess and in the 2001 feature film Recess: School's Out. Although primarily recognized for his television work, he has been noted as a "great improv player" by Garry Shandling as a result of their time working together doing improv in the late 1970s. Cheers producer Ken Levine has also acknowledged Willson as "one of the greatest improv artists I have EVER seen."

Since 2012 he has appeared in television ads for Safeco Insurance.

References

External links

1945 births
Living people
American male film actors
American male television actors
Male actors from Minnesota
People from Fairmont, Minnesota
Reed College alumni
20th-century American male actors
21st-century American male actors